Centennial High School (CHS) is a public high school located in Gresham, Oregon, United States.

Academics
In 1989, Centennial High School was honored in the Blue Ribbon Schools Program, the highest honor a school can receive in the United States.

In 2008, 76% of the school's seniors received a high school diploma. Of 411 students, 311 graduated, 73 dropped out, eight received a modified diploma, and 19 were still in high school in 2009.

In 2012, Kevin Ricker was named the Oregon High School Principal of the Year. Along with making other improvements in the school, he was awarded this title primarily for leading CHS students to raise both reading and math test scores by 12% in one year.

In February 2014 the school hosted Unity Week.

In 2016, Katharine Dean, a science teacher of Centennial High School won Presidential Award for Excellence in Mathematics and Science Teaching.

In 2018 Chris Knudsen, a 158-158 head coach, had resigned after 32 years of service.

Activities
Centennial's marching band has won the Portland Grand Floral Parade more than 20 times, including 15 times consecutively. The band's 2000 fall field show, "Gloria", held the record for the highest scoring show in the Northwest Marching Band Circuit.

Centennial's Future Business Leaders of America chapter has won the 6A Chapter of the Year title for five years in a row.

In 2016, a Centennial High School senior Grace Ramstad was crowned the 2016 Rose Festival Queen.

Sports
Centennial hosts a track meet called the Centennial Invitational, which is one of the largest high school track meets in the region.

State championships
Football: 1972
Boys' track and field: 1967
Girls' track and field: 1976
Boys' soccer: 1983
Girls' soccer: 2000
Dance and drill: 1988, 1990, 2003, and 2010
Winterguard: 2010
Marching band: 1999, 2000
Choir: 1993, 1994
Bowling: 2008
Bass Fishing Championships

Notable alumni
Scott Benedetti, soccer player
Earl Blumenauer (1966), Member of the U.S. House of Representatives from 
Josh Cameron, soccer player
Samuel Clemens, journalist
Marco Farfan, soccer player
Todd Field (1982), three-time Academy Award-nominated filmmaker
Robert Garrigus, golfer
Katie Harman (1999), Miss America 2002
Rick Metsger, Oregon politician
Nico Santos, Filipino-American actor

References

High schools in Multnomah County, Oregon
Education in Gresham, Oregon
Public high schools in Oregon
Buildings and structures in Gresham, Oregon
1959 establishments in Oregon